Abortion in Ukraine is legal on request during the first twelve weeks of pregnancy. Between 12 and 28 weeks, abortion is available on a variety of grounds, including medical, social and personal grounds, and for any reason with the approval of a commission of physicians.

Prior to 1991, abortion in Ukraine was governed by the abortion laws of the Soviet Union. The laws have not changed since then. Abortion rates have fallen from 109 abortions per 1000 women aged 15–44 in 1986 to 80.9 in 1991, 67.2 in 1996 and 27.5 in 2004. , the abortion rate was 21.2 abortions per 1000 women aged 15–44. In 2014 the abortion rate in Ukraine decreased to 14.89 per 1000 women aged 15–44. Abortion rates in Ukraine and Belarus have converged in recent years, creating a large gap with post-Soviet Russia.

Near the end of a long interview in 2019 during his political campaign, Volodymyr Zelenskyy (now President of Ukraine) was asked about abortion rights. The interviewer mentioned to Zelenskyy that laws are often adopted in Eastern and Central Europe that cause public outcry, saying that in Poland, for example, there were huge protests when the Polish government wanted to ban abortion. Zelenskyy stated that abortion should not be banned, that to get an abortion is a personal choice, and that there needs to be less impingement on human freedom.

Notes

References

Ukraine
Healthcare in Ukraine
Ukraine